North Dakota Vision Services/School for the Blind (NDVS/SB, Braille: ⠝⠙⠧⠎⠎⠃) is a branch of the North Dakota government offering services to visually impaired residents of all ages in North Dakota. It is centered in Grand Forks, with regional offices in Bismarck, Fargo, Jamestown, and Minot.

The institution was founded in 1908 as the North Dakota School for the Blind (NDSB) in Bathgate; it moved to its current location in Grand Forks in 1961. The North Dakota Legislative Assembly officially changed the name to North Dakota Vision Services/School for the Blind in 2001.

Campus
The current Grand Forks campus has a dormitory that was renovated in 1995.

References

External links
North Dakota Vision Services/School for the Blind website
State School for the Blind, Bathgate, N.D. from the Digital Horizons website

Public high schools in North Dakota
Educational institutions established in 1908
Schools for the blind in the United States
Grand Forks, North Dakota
Schools in Grand Forks County, North Dakota
Public middle schools in North Dakota
Public elementary schools in North Dakota
Public K-12 schools in the United States
Public boarding schools in the United States
Boarding schools in North Dakota
1908 establishments in North Dakota